Jean-Berchmans Nterere (born 1 Sep 1942 in Nkuna; died 2001) was a Burundian clergyman and bishop for the Roman Catholic Diocese of Muyinga. He became ordained in 1970. He was appointed bishop in 1992.

References

20th-century Roman Catholic bishops in Burundi
1942 births
2001 deaths
People from Bujumbura Rural Province
Roman Catholic bishops of Muyinga